In the stratigraphy sub-discipline of geology, a Global Standard Stratigraphic Age, abbreviated GSSA, is a chronological reference point and criterion in the geologic record used to define the boundaries (an internationally sanctioned benchmark point) between different geological periods, epochs or ages on the overall geologic time scale in a chronostratigraphically useful rock layer. A worldwide multidisciplinary effort has been ongoing since 1974 to define such important metrics. The points and strata need be widespread and contain an identifiable sequence of layers or other unambiguous marker (identifiable or quantifiable) attributes.

GSSAs are defined by the International Commission on Stratigraphy (ICS) under the auspices of their parent organization, the International Union of Geological Sciences (IUGS), and are used primarily for time dating of rock layers older than 630 million years ago, lacking a good fossil record. 

The geologic record becomes spotty prior to about 539 million years ago. This is because the Earth's crust in geological time scales is constantly being recycled by tectonic and weathering forces, and older rocks and especially readily accessible exposed strata that can act as a time calibration are rare.

For more recent periods, a Global Boundary Stratotype Section and Point (GSSP), largely based on paleontology and improved methods of fossil dating, is used to define such boundaries.  In contrast to GSSAs, GSSPs are based on important events and transitions within a particular stratigraphic section.  In older sections, there is insufficient fossil record or well preserved sections to identify the key events necessary for a GSSP, so GSSAs are defined based on fixed dates and selected criteria.
The ICS first attempts to meet the standards of the GSSPs (see below) and if those fail, usually have enough information to make a preliminary selection of several competing GSSA prospects or proposals.

See also

European Mammal Neogene
North American Land Mammal Age
Type locality
List of GSSPs

References

 Hedberg, H.D., (editor), International stratigraphic guide: A guide to stratigraphic classification, terminology, and procedure, New York, John Wiley and Sons, 1976

External links
The Global Boundary Stratotype Section and Point (GSSP): overview
Chart of The Global Boundary Stratotype Sections and Points (GSSP): chart
Geotime chart displaying geologic time periods compared to the fossil record - Deals with chronology and classifications for laymen (not GSSA/GSSPs)

Geologic time scales of Earth
Units of time
Earth sciences
Geochronology
Stratigraphy